Mountain House (formerly, Zimmerman's and Zimmerman's Mountain House) was a historic waystop for forty-niners halfway from San Francisco to the Sierra Nevada gold country. Today it is an unincorporated community in Alameda County, California, United States. San Joaquin County's Mountain House borrowed the name of the historic Mountain House and is located two miles (3 km) to the northeast further downstream on Mountain House Creek.

History
The Cholbon triblet of the Northern Valley Yokuts were the original inhabitants of the Mountain House area. Their territory ran along Old River a distributary of the San Joaquin River.

In 1849 Thomas Goodall erected a blue denim cloth tent to serve as a midway stopover for gold miners headed from San Francisco to the Sierra Nevada (U.S.) foothills via Altamont Pass. Goodall eventually built an adobe house at the eastern edge of the Diablo Range hills, calling it The Mountain House. Simon Zimmerman later acquired the stop and it became known as Zimmerman's Mountain House, and became a well-known way station stop on the way to Stockton. The last remaining settlement buildings were leveled in 1940. In November 1994, the San Joaquin County Board of Supervisors officially launched the new community of Mountain House two miles to the northwest along Mountain House Creek.

The Elk Horn post office, which operated from 1852 to 1853, was located at or near Mountain House.

In 1915 the county road, passing in front of Mountain House, became the Lincoln Highway, America's first to-coast paved road.

The Mountain House Bar now occupies the site of the original Mountain House, and is located at 16784 West Grantline Road.

References

Unincorporated communities in Alameda County, California
California Gold Rush